Snapshot, snapshots or snap shot may refer to:

 Snapshot (photography), a photograph taken without preparation

Computing
 Snapshot (computer storage), the state of a system at a particular point in time
 Snapshot (file format) or SNP, a file format for reports from Microsoft Access

Film
 Snapshot (film), a 1979 Australian film directed by Simon Wincer
 Snapshots (film), a 2018 American film directed by Melanie Mayron
 Snap Shot (film), an upcoming film

Music
 "Snapshot" (Sylvia song), 1983
 "Snapshot" (RuPaul song), 1996
 "Snap Shot", a 1981 song by Slave
 "SnapShot", a 2018 K-pop song by In2It

Albums
 Snapshot (Daryl Braithwaite album), a 2005 album by Australian musician Daryl Braithwaite
 Snapshot (Sylvia album), a 1983 album by American country music singer Sylvia
 Snapshot (Mission of Burma album), a 2004 live album by American band Mission of Burma
 Snapshot (Roger Glover album), a 2005 album by English musician Roger Glover
 Snapshot (The Strypes album), a 2013 album by Irish band The Strypes
 Snapshot, a 2000 album by Canadian band Knacker
 Snapshots (Eleanor McEvoy album), a 1999 album by Eleanor McEvoy
 Snapshots (Kim Wilde album), a 2011 covers album by Kim Wilde

Other uses
 Snapshot (board game), a 1979 board wargame published by Game Designers' Workshop
 Snapshot (video game), a 2012 platform indie game
 Snapshot, a 2005 novel by Garry Disher
 Snapshot, a 2017 novella by Brandon Sanderson
 SNAPSHOT or SNAP-10A, a 1965 American nuclear-powered satellite
 Snap shot (ice hockey), a fast shot made by snapping the wrists
 Snapshots (TV series), a 2016 Canadian reality program for children
 Snapshots, a 2005 jukebox musical of Stephen Schwartz songs